Star Trek Continues is an American fan-made web series set in the Star Trek universe. Produced by the nonprofit charity Trek Continues, Inc. and Dracogen, and initially co-produced by Far from Home LLC and Farragut Films, the series consists of 11 episodes released between 2013 and 2017. The series is an unofficial direct continuation of Star Trek: The Original Series, and emulates its visual and storytelling features to achieve the same look and feel.  Those who made the show have said in interviews that the intent was to finish the original five-year mission of the show, and this is borne out in the plot lines of the final two episodes.

The series was fan-created and all episodes were released to watch on YouTube. As with all such Star Trek fan productions, use of copyrighted and trademarked properties from the original series was allowed so long as the production was not commercial. A portion of the funds necessary to produce the episodes was raised through successful Kickstarter and Indiegogo campaigns, to which thousands of backers contributed.

Star Trek Continues won a Webby Award for "People's Choice – Long Form Drama" in 2016, a Geekie Award for "Best Web Series" in 2014, and numerous Telly and Accolade awards. The series was very positively received by critics, who praised the quality of the production and stated that the show set a new standard for Star Trek fan films.

After the 11th episode was released in late 2017, the Star Trek Continues series ended.

Cast

Regular cast
 Vic Mignogna, as James T. Kirk, is the captain and commanding officer of the USS Enterprise. Mignogna is best known for his voice-acting work and is a longtime Star Trek fan.
 Todd Haberkorn, as Spock, is a human/Vulcan hybrid, commander, science officer, and first officer, and one of the captain's closest friends. Haberkorn is a voice actor and played Kevin the Teenaxian in Star Trek Beyond.
 Chuck Huber (Larry Nemecek in episodes 1–2) as Leonard H. McCoy, MD, lieutenant commander, and chief medical officer, and also one of the captain's closest friends. Huber is also a voice actor. Nemecek is a well-recognized Trek expert and author of the Star Trek: The Next Generation Companion.
 Chris Doohan as Montgomery Scott, lieutenant commander and chief engineer, usually referred to as Scotty. Doohan is the son of actor James Doohan, who portrayed the character in the original series. Doohan was also an extra in Star Trek: The Motion Picture, and portrayed a transporter chief in the 2009 film Star Trek and its sequel, Star Trek Into Darkness. He reprised his father's role of Scotty in Star Trek Online.

Featured cast
 Grant Imahara as Hikaru Sulu, lieutenant, helmsman, and third officer. Imahara was best known for his work on Discovery's MythBusters, as well as the creator of robot sidekick, "Geoff Peterson," for Late Late Show with Craig Ferguson.
 Kim Stinger as Nyota Uhura, lieutenant and communications officer.
 Wyatt Lenhart as Pavel A. Chekov, lieutenant j.g. (formerly ensign) and navigator.
 Michele Specht as Elise McKennah, psychologist, a lieutenant, and Starfleet's first full-time ship's counselor. Specht voiced Specialist Krog (a Na'kuhl agent), Loriss (a Vorta), and Sh'marois (an Andorian Starfleet captain) in Star Trek Online.

Trek alumni guest and recurring actors
Several past members of the Star Trek cast and crew expressed support for the project and contributed to it, as did several who went on to participate in officially licensed productions later.
 Beau Billingslea as Vice Admiral Stomm (episode 7), an operations-division flag officer from Earth Spacedock. Billingslea played Captain Abbott in Star Trek Into Darkness.
 Kipleigh Brown as Lieutenant j.g. (formerly Yeoman) Barbara Smith (episodes 3–6, 8–11), the Enterprise's relief conn officer. Brown played Jane Taylor in Star Trek: Enterprise and Kuumaarke in Star Trek Online.
 John de Lancie as Galisti (episode 9). De Lancie played Q in Star Trek: The Next Generation, Star Trek: Deep Space Nine, Star Trek: Voyager, Star Trek: Lower Decks, and Star Trek: Picard.
 Michael Dorn as the ISS Enterprise computer voice (episode 3). Dorn played Commander Worf in Star Trek: The Next Generation, Star Trek: Deep Space Nine, and Star Trek Online, and the four Star Trek feature films featuring the cast of Star Trek: The Next Generation; he also played Worf's grandfather and namesake Colonel Worf in Star Trek VI: The Undiscovered Country.
 Doug Drexler as Paladin (episode 1). Drexler is probably best known for his work as an award-winning visual-effects artist on Star Trek, as well as Battlestar Galactica and Defiance. He also contributed visual effects for episodes 1–6 of Star Trek Continues.
 Michael Forest as Apollo (episode 1). Forest reprises his role from The Original Series episode "Who Mourns for Adonais?" (which had aired 47 years earlier). 
 Jason Isaacs (credited as "Jason Lorca") is an ESPer voice (episode 11). Isaacs played Captain Gabriel Lorca in Star Trek: Discovery and Star Trek Online.
 Mark Rolston as Admiral McGuinness (episode 9), head of Starfleet Medical. Rolston played various roles in Star Trek: The Next Generation and Star Trek: Enterprise.
 Rekha Sharma as Avi Samara (episode 8). Sharma played Commander Ellen Landry in Star Trek: Discovery and Star Trek Online.
 Marina Sirtis as the computer voice in episodes 1, 4, 7, 10, and 11. Sirtis played Commander Deanna Troi in Star Trek: The Next Generation, Star Trek: Voyager (three episodes), Star Trek: Enterprise (one episode), Star Trek: Picard (one episode), Star Trek: Lower Decks (one episode) and four Star Trek feature films.

Other recurring actors
Additional recurring actors — who were not specifically Trek alumni — included:
 Martin Bradford as Lieutenant Joseph "Jabilo" G. M'Benga, MD (episodes 5, 10), relief medical officer.
 Steven Dengler as Lieutenant William C. Drake, chief of security (episodes 1–10). Dengler is also the founder of Dracogen, one of the producers of the series.
 Erin Gray as Commodore Laura Gray, commanding officer of the Corinth IV starbase (episodes 2, 7). 
 Reuben Langdon as Lieutenant Kubaro Dickerson, security guard (episodes 2, 3, 6, 10, and 11).
 Cat Roberts as Lieutenant Elizabeth Palmer, relief communications officer (episodes 3–4, 6–11). Dr. Roberts is a practicing physician.
 Liz Wagner as Ensign Lia Burke, registered nurse (episodes 3–5, 9–11).

Other guest actors and support
The first episode, "Pilgrim of Eternity", featured Jamie Bamber (Lee "Apollo" Adama from Battlestar Galactica and Matt Devlin from Law and Order UK), as well as original-series guest actor Michael Forest reprising his role as Apollo. Marina Sirtis voiced the computer of the USS Enterprise, an homage to her connection to the original actress, Majel Barrett Roddenberry, who portrayed her character's mother, Lwaxana Troi, as well as the voice of the computer in the original Star Trek: The Next Generation and ‘’Star Trek’’, respectively.

For the second episode, "Lolani", Lou Ferrigno (the Hulk from The Incredible Hulk (1978)) appeared as Zaminhon, Daniel Logan (Boba Fett from Star Wars: Episode II – Attack of the Clones) appeared as Ensign Tongaroa, Erin Gray (Col. Wilma Deering from Buck Rogers in the 25th Century) appeared as Commodore Gray and Matthew Ewald (Nicholas Bluetooth from Galidor) appeared as Crewman Kenway.

The third episode, "Fairest of Them All", featured guest support from Asia DeMarcos as Marlena Moreau (played in the original series by BarBara Luna), Bobby Clark as Council Leader Tharn, Bobby Quinn Rice as transporter technician, Michael Dorn as the computer of the ISS Enterprise, and the first appearance of Kipleigh Brown as Barbara Smith (played in the original series by Andrea Dromm). Recurring cast member Cat Roberts (Lieutenant Palmer, played in the original series by Elizabeth Rogers), joined the series as of this episode.

The fourth episode, "The White Iris", featured the return of Sirtis as the Enterprise computer, as well as guest stars Colin Baker (Doctor Who), Nakia Burrise (Power Rangers), Adrienne Wilkinson (Xena: Warrior Princess), Tiffany Brouwer (Femme Fatales), and Gabriela Fresquez, with cameos by Chris Gore and Robert J. Sawyer.

Episode six, "Come Not Between the Dragons", guest-starred Gigi Edgley of Farscape fame. Rod Roddenberry, son of Star Trek creator Gene Roddenberry, had a cameo appearance as a bridge officer in the episode.

Episode seven, "Embracing the Winds", featured Clare Kramer (Buffy the Vampire Slayer) and Beau Billingslea (Cowboy Bebop), as well as the return of Erin Gray's flag officer character (Commodore Gray from the second episode) and Marina Sirtis as the computer voice.

Episode eight, "Still Treads the Shadow", featured Rekha Sharma (Battlestar Galactica and Star Trek: Discovery).

Episode nine, "What Ships are For", featured John de Lancie (three Star Trek series) and Anne Lockhart (the original Battlestar Galactica series).

Episodes 10 and 11, "To Boldly Go: Part I" and "To Boldly Go: Part II" written by Sawyer, featured Nicola Bryant (Doctor Who), Cas Anvar (The Expanse), Amy Rydell (reprising her mother Joanne Linville's role from the original series), and Mark Meer (Mass Effect). Part I features April Hebert in the role of Rear Admiral Thesp, who was the longest-tenured cast member of Star Trek: The Experience at the time of its closing. Jason Isaacs (Captain Gabriel Lorca from Star Trek: Discovery) also provides a vocal cameo in Part II, although credited under the pseudonym Jason Lorca.

Production

After directing an episode of Starship Farragut for Farragut Films, Mignogna proposed to the companies involved in its production to form a partnership to support the development of a new web series, aimed at continuing the episodes of TOS.

A facility of 9,600 ft2 (891 m2) was acquired in Kingsland, Georgia, to host the sets of the Enterprise, which were built from the original soundstage blueprints.

On March 23, 2012, Farragut Films announced the official cast of the series that, among other professionals, included Chris Doohan (son of James Doohan) and MythBusters''' Grant Imahara.

Mignogna and the production team recreated the style of the original series in its sets, cinematography, costumes, acting, and storytelling style. They duplicated the four-act structure used in the original because of the need for commercial breaks. They primarily used the original series' incidental music, as well as the original theme song and credit typography. Starting with the fifth episode, original music by composer Andy Farber was  included. They shot the episodes in 4:3 aspect ratio to duplicate the original series' TV format.

The first episode, "Pilgrim of Eternity", premiered at Phoenix Comicon on May 24, 2013, and was released to the public the same day. "Lolani", the second episode, finished shooting in November 2013 with guest stars Lou Ferrigno and Erin Gray. The episode was released online in February 2014 after premiering at Dallas Sci-Fi Expo in Dallas, Texas. Episode three, "Fairest of Them All", began principal photography that month, with a premiere at Supanova 2014 in Sydney, Australia in June 2014. Pre-production on the fourth episode of the series, "The White Iris", began in November 2014, with a release on May 29, 2015, at Phoenix Comicon. The fifth episode premiered on September 25, 2015, at Salt Lake Comic Con followed by a public release on the following day.

According to the ending credits of "Fairest of Them All", a scene of the episode was shot on location at NASA's Space Center Houston, home of the restored life-sized prop of the original Star Trek Galileo shuttlecraft.

In early 2015, Star Trek Continues announced the acquisition of the remainder of the Kingsland facility, totaling 18,500 ft2, under exclusive ownership of Trek Continues Inc. The studio was rebranded as "Stage 9", a homage to the original series' soundstage at Desilu.

Kickstarter campaigns
After releasing the first episode, funded by Mignogna, new funds for the continuation of the series were raised in part from a successful Kickstarter campaign, humorously dubbed a "Kirkstarter". It was held from October 7 to November 6, 2013, and raised $126,028 from 2,981 backers, surpassing the set goal of $100,000, to cover funding for episodes 2, 3, and 4.

A second Kickstarter campaign ran from January 17 to February 16, 2015. It successfully raised $214,584, exceeding its goal of $100,000. The sum covered the production costs of episodes 5, 6, and 7, and facilitated the construction of an engineering room and planet set.

A third and final crowdfunding campaign—this time organized via Indiegogo—was held in early 2016, raising $199,049. Shortly thereafter, the producers announced that additional private donations to the Trek Continues Inc. charity allowed the company to exceed its fundraising goal of $350,000, thus enabling the production of four additional episodes.

Episodes

Full episodes

Short vignettes
Before screening the first episode, a series of three short videos, called vignettes, was released from July 31 to November 30, 2012. The first vignette is an extended ending of the last episode of the original series, "Turnabout Intruder", created to present the fan production as a direct continuation of it.

Reaction

Reception
The reception of Star Trek Continues has been very positive, with critics and reviewers highlighting the quality of the production and the resemblance of the episodes with those of the original series. On July 12, 2013, Dan Roth of SyFy's Blastr wrote: "Lots of people try to make fan versions of Trek. None of them look like this." Slice of SciFi's Sam Sloan wrote: "They have certainly raised the bar for independent Star Trek episodic film making", an opinion shared by other reviewers as well. On June 18, 2014, Bill Watters of TrekMovie.com wrote: "Star Trek Continues does deserve the 'Continues' in its title as they do a really strong job at capturing (and yes, 'continuing') the atmosphere of TOS."

On December 16, 2013, about a month after the ending of the Kickstarter campaign, Kevin Pollak's Chat Show published a video interview with Tom Hanks in which the actor highly praises a Star Trek fan production and its "people that recreate with incredibly, startlingly great production values unseen Star Trek episodes", adding that "it looks exactly like the starship Enterprise". Although he could not put a name to the series, he described it citing information compatible with the identity of Star Trek Continues, which motivated the producers and a few sources to assume and claim that the actor was referring to them.

On July 31, 2014, Rod Roddenberry attended an official screening of "Fairest of Them All" in Las Vegas and endorsed the project, stating: "I do have to say, and I said this after 'Lolani', I'm pretty damn sure my dad would consider this canon. The fact that you do stories that mean something, that have depth, that make us all think a little bit, I really think he would applaud you guys, and I applaud you guys, and as far as I am concerned, it is canon. So thank you."

The publication Wired has dedicated to Star Trek Continues five videos of its video series Obsessed, that aims to highlight "what happens when people live out their obsessions to the fullest." Obsessed shows Mignogna and other people of the staff explaining to what extent they have paid attention to detail to recreate the Enterprise set and the visual style of the original series. The videos have been published from June 13 to July 1, 2014, on the Obsessed website.

Awards and nominations

See also

 Star Trek: New Voyages: another fan made series modeled on the original Star Trek'' series

References

External links
 
 
 Official YouTube channel

2013 web series debuts
2017 web series endings
Crowdfunded web series
Continues
Star Trek web series